Two people named Lockier Clere Burges have been prominent in Western Australia.  For the Lockier Clere Burges born in 1841, see Lockier Burges (1841-1929)

Lockier Clere Burges (c. 1814–31 July 1886) was an early settler in colonial Western Australia who became a leading pastoralist in the colony, and a Member of the Western Australian Legislative Council.

Lockier Burges was born at Fethard in Tipperary, Ireland around 1814. In 1829, he emigrated to Western Australia with his two brothers William Burges and Samuel Evans Burges. The three brothers sailed for the Swan River Colony on board the Warrior, arriving in March 1830. They named their new selection Tipperary in honour of their birthplace. In 1849, Lockier and William Burges moved to the Champion Bay area, leaving Samuel at Tipperary. Initially Lockier was Superintendent of the Geraldine lead mine.

In January 1860 Burges visited Ireland, returning to Western Australia in November 1862.

Burges is noted in ornithology for specimens of birds obtained at York, supplied to John Gilbert and recorded by John Gould in Birds of Australia. Amongst the poorly known species he provided was one of the pied honeyeater Certhionyx variegatus and the type specimen of the grey falcon Falco hypoleucos.

On 14 January 1879, Lockier Burges was nominated to the Western Australian Legislative Council.  He held the position until 2 July 1884.  In his final years he retired to Perth, where he died, unmarried, on 31 July 1886.

References

1813 births
1886 deaths
19th-century Irish people
Irish emigrants to colonial Australia
Members of the Western Australian Legislative Council
Settlers of Western Australia
Politicians from County Tipperary
19th-century Australian politicians